Olayemi Ogunwole popularly known as Honey Pot is a radio and TV host with TVC Communications, Lagos, Nigeria.

Education 
Honey Pot is a graduate of English from the Obafemi Awolowo University, Nigeria.

Career

Early broadcasting career
She started out her broadcasting career during her university days at the OAU, Ile-Ife as a TV host with NTA Ile-Ife where she anchored Fact Finding with Yemi. She was also a member of the Orientation Broadcasting Service (OBS) during her National Youth Service year in Anambra State, Nigeria.

Later broadcasting career
After her NYSC year, she proceeded to the Bisi Olatilo Show (BOS). After a spell at BOS, she went to the FRCN training school. She went on to Rock City 101.9 FM, Abeokuta, where she hosted Rock Game and Read the News and then to Star 101.5 FM, where she hosted the Midday Belt and also read the news. She then proceeded to Rainbow 94.1 FM, where she rose to the position of Head of Programmes before her present spell at Max FM (previously Radio Continental).

Other career
Apart from her broadcasting career, Honeypot has also voiced commercials for brands like Harpic, First Monie by First Bank and other commercials. She hosted the 2017 City People Music Awards alongside Ruggedman.

Awards and recognitions 
She was given a Special Recognition Award for her remarkable performance in reporting Entertainment on TV via Entertainment Splash by City People in 2016.

References 

Yoruba radio personalities
Yoruba women television personalities
Nigerian radio presenters
Nigerian women radio presenters
Nigerian television presenters
Nigerian women television presenters
Obafemi Awolowo University alumni
Living people
Year of birth missing (living people)